The .38 Smith & Wesson Model Military & Police Model of 1905  is the third of Smith & Wesson's .38 Hand Ejector models. Later models in this series include the .38 Military & Police Victory Model and the S&W Model 10. The Model 1905, as with the other .38 Hand Ejector models, is a six-shot revolver built on the Smith and Wesson K frame, with a swing-out cylinder chambered in .38 Special. At various times throughout its production, it was offered with a round or square butt grip frame; checkered walnut or hard rubber grip stocks; with or without a lanyard ring on the butt; blue, nickel, or chrome (produced in very small quantities) finish; and a barrel length of 2", 4", 5", 6", or 6.5".  This model had a "five screw" frame, with four screws holding the side plate and one screw at the front of the trigger guard.

Variations
Four minor design changes were made during the production run of the Model 1905, with two, the 1st and 2nd changes, overlapping in manufacture. Additionally, at approximately serial number 316648, the factory began heat treating cylinders.

.38 Military & Police Model of 1905 - 10,800 manufactured c. 1905 - 1906
.38 Military & Police Model of 1905 1st and 2nd change - 73,648 manufactured c. 1906 - 1909
.38 Military & Police Model of 1905 3rd change - 94,803 manufactured c. 1909 - 1915
.38 Military & Police Model of 1905 4th Change - 758,296 manufactured c. 1915 - 1942

References

 Blue Book of Gun Values, 29th Ed., Blue Book Publications Inc.
 Cartridges of the World, 10th Ed., Krause Publications Inc.
 Gun Traders Guide, 28th Ed., Stoeger Publishing Co.
 Article "S&W's M&P", Guns & Ammo Magazine, Payton Miller, December 23, 2008.

External links
 Alpha-Catalogue 1911: S & W 1905 (variants, details and salesprices in German-Mark (1911)), Page 161, archive.org.

Smith & Wesson revolvers
.38 Special firearms